Boana nigra, the black-flanked tree frog, is a frog in the family Hylidae.  It is endemic to Ecuador. Scientists have seen it between 910 and 1847 meters above sea level.

The adult male frog measures 38.5 to 46.3 mm in snout-vent length and the adult female frog 56.4 to 76.7 mm. This frog is brown, reddish brown, or darn brown on the back with darker spots.  It has black sides and black stripes.  The webs on its feet are either black or bright orange.

This frog's English and scientific names come from the Latin word for "black."

See also 
Boana semilineata
Boana appendiculata
Boana geographica

References

Frogs of South America
Boana
Endemic fauna of Ecuador